University Dr/Rural, also known as ASU Tempe Campus or simply University for the school and street, is a station on the Metro light rail line in Tempe, Arizona, United States.  The station is not actually at the intersection of its named streets, sitting some distance south of University Drive, with the platforms running northwest from Rural Road along the former alignment of the Phoenix and Eastern Railroad.

FlixBus boards from the north bay on the west side of the station.

The station features "The Spirit of Inquiry," a monumental spherical sculpture by Seattle artists Bill Will and Norie Sato.

Ridership

Notable places nearby
 Arizona State University at the Tempe campus
 Gallery of Scientific Exploration
 Marston Exploration Theater

References

External links
 Valley Metro map

Valley Metro Rail stations
Arizona State University
Transportation in Tempe, Arizona
Railway stations in the United States opened in 2008
2008 establishments in Arizona
Buildings and structures in Tempe, Arizona
Railway stations in the United States at university and college campuses